During World War II, two operations in the Pacific theater were called Operation Coronet.

 An early planning name for Operation Chronicle, which was executed in June 1943
 Part of Operation Downfall, the planned invasion of Japan in March 1946, made unnecessary by the Japanese surrender in August 1945

See also
 Operation Coronet Nighthawk, to stop drugs entering U.S.A. from Central and South America (1990-2001)